Csaba Hegedűs (born 6 September 1948) is a retired middleweight Greco-Roman wrestler from Hungary. In 1971, he won a world title and was named the Hungarian Sportsman of the year. He competed at the 1972 and 1976 Olympics and won a gold medal in 1972. In 1973, he barely survived a traffic accident. He recovered by 1975, when he placed fourth at the world championships, and won European titles in 1976 and 1977. Between 1979 and 1989 he coached the Hungarian wrestling team and later became a sports administrator, working at the national wrestling association, the Hungarian Olympic Committee, and the Fédération Internationale des Luttes Associées (FILA).

He served as President of the Hungarian Wrestling Association from 1992 to 2015. He was replaced by Szilárd Németh.

References

1948 births
Living people
Olympic wrestlers of Hungary
Wrestlers at the 1972 Summer Olympics
Wrestlers at the 1976 Summer Olympics
Hungarian male sport wrestlers
Olympic gold medalists for Hungary
Olympic medalists in wrestling
Medalists at the 1972 Summer Olympics